The 2014 Brisbane Roar FC W-League season was the club's seventh participation in the W-League, since the league's formation in 2008.

Players

Squad information

Transfers

In

Out

Competitions

W-League

Regular season

Statistics

Results summary

Ladder

Results and position per round

League Goalscorers per Round

Awards
 Player of the Week (Round 6) – Katrina Gorry

References

External links
 Official Website

Brisbane Roar FC (A-League Women) seasons
Brisbane Roar